Gabriel Soriano (born May 3, 1971) is a Mexican writer, director and producer.

Early life 
Soriano studied film in New York and produced and directed four feature films, including Seis días en la oscuridad. This film participated in several film festivals around the world and was nominated for the Best First Work, Ópera Prima, by the Society of Mexican Cinema Journalists, Asociación de Periodistas Cinematográficos de México. Gabriel is the founder and CEO of Paynal Media, an independent film production company based in Houston, Texas. Paynal also develops web sites and TV shows for Spanish audience.

Filmography

References

External links
 
 
 Paynal Media

1972 births
Living people
Mexican film directors